Fréderic-Albert Gustave Bruynseels (13 July 1888 – 10 October 1959) was a Belgian sailor who competed in the 1920 Summer Olympics. He was a crew member of the Belgian boat Edelweiß, which won the gold medal in the 6-metre class (1907 rating).

References

External links 
 
 

1888 births
1959 deaths
Belgian male sailors (sport)
Sailors at the 1920 Summer Olympics – 6 Metre
Olympic sailors of Belgium
Olympic gold medalists for Belgium
Olympic medalists in sailing
Medalists at the 1920 Summer Olympics
20th-century Belgian people